John Webber  (6 October 1751 – 29 May 1793) was an English artist who accompanied Captain Cook on his third Pacific expedition. He is best known for his images of Australasia, Hawaii and Alaska.

Biography 
Webber was born in London, educated in Bern and studied painting at Paris. His father was Abraham Wäber, a Swiss sculptor who had moved to London, and changed his name to Webber before marrying a Mrs Mary Quant in 1744.

Webber served as official artist on James Cook's third voyage of discovery around the Pacific (1776–1880) aboard . At Adventure Bay in January 1777 he did drawings of "A Man of Van Diemen's Land" and "A Woman of Van Diemen's Land". He also did many drawings of scenes in New Zealand and the South Sea islands. On this voyage, during which Cook lost his life in a fight in Hawaii, Webber became the first European artist to make contact with Hawaii, then called the Sandwich Islands.  He made numerous watercolor landscapes of the islands of Kauai and Hawaii, and also portrayed many of the Hawaiian people.

In April 1778, Captain Cook's ships Resolution and Discovery anchored at Ship Cove, now known as Nootka Sound, Vancouver Island, Canada to refit. The crew took observations and recorded encounters with the local people. Webber made watercolour landscapes including "Resolution and Discovery in Ship Cove, 1778". His drawings and paintings were engraved for the British Admiralty's account of the expedition, which was published in 1784.

Back in England in 1780 Webber exhibited around 50 works at Royal Academy exhibitions between 1784 and 1792, and was elected an associate of the Royal Academy in 1785 and R.A. in 1791. Most of his work were landscapes. Sometimes figures were included as in "A Party from H.M.S. Resolution shooting sea horses", which was shown at the academy in 1784, and his "The Death of Captain Cook" became well known through an engraving of it. Another version of this picture is in the William Dixson gallery at Sydney.

Collections
The Anchorage Museum of History and Art (Alaska), the Museum of the Aleutians (Alaska), the Bishop Museum (Honolulu), the Honolulu Museum of Art, the Peabody Essex Museum (Salem, Massachusetts), the Yale University Art Gallery, the British Museum, the Sir John Soane's Museum (London), The National Maritime Museum (London), the Museum of New Zealand Te Papa Tongarewa
, the John Carter Brown Library, and the Mitchell Library (Australia) are among the public collections holding works by John Webber.

Australia
Webber's art is held by a number of Australian institutions including the National Portrait Gallery (William Bligh, c.1776, The Death of Captain Cook (engraving), 1784, and Portrait of Captain James Cook RN, 1782); the Australian National Maritime Museum (View of Huaheine, 1784); the Art Gallery of New South Wales (A View in Otaheite Peha, 1785); the National Library of Australia (includes 
Sea Otter, 1778, A Woman of Pulo Condore, 1780, Portrait of Captain John Gore, 1780, Poedua, Daughter of Orea, King of Ulietea, Society Islands, 1782, Portrait of Captain James King, 1782, A Dance in Otaheite, 1784,  A Woman of Van Diemen's Land, 1784, A Chief of the Sandwich Islands, 1787, and The Resolution Beating Through the Ice, 1792,); the Dixson Library (includes An Opossum of Van Diemen's Land, 1777, Red-tailed Tropic Bird, 1777, and The Death of Captain Cook, c.1781–83.); and the National Gallery of Victoria (A Night Dance by Men, in Hapaee, 1784, A Young Woman of the Sandwich Islands, 1784, and A Man of Van Diemen's Land, 1784.).

Works

See also
 European and American voyages of scientific exploration

References 
 Ellis, George R., Honolulu Academy of Arts, Selected Works, Honolulu, Honolulu Academy of Arts, 1990, 178,
 Forbes, David W., Encounters with Paradise: Views of Hawaii and its People, 1778–1941, Honolulu Academy of Arts, 1992, 15–85.

External links
 
 Biography at the Dictionary of Canadian Biography Online
Digitized works at the John Carter Brown Library

1752 births
1793 deaths
18th-century English painters
English male painters
English people of Swiss descent
English explorers of North America
Explorers of Alaska
James Cook
Painters from London
Royal Academicians
18th-century English male artists